Uwe Ludewig (born 26 June 1967 in Helmstedt) is a German agricultural scientist specialising in plant physiology. He is director of the Institute for Crop Science at the University of Hohenheim.

Biography 
After school in Braunschweig Ludewig studied physics, particularly biophysics, at the Technical University in the same city. He then studied at the Georg-August University in Göttingen, where he completed his studies with a Diploma at the Max-Planck-Institut for Biophysical Chemistry (Dept. of Membrane Physics).
 
Ludewig then studied as a post graduate at the University of Hamburg and obtained his Doctorate (Dr. rer. nat.) in 1996 with a thesis on The Structure and Function of Chloride Canals under Thomas Jentsch.  
After working abroad on an EMBO Postdoc Stipendium at Seville University in Spain under Prof. Lopes-Barneo he moved to Prof. Wolf Frommer in Tuebingen University.

In 2002 Ludewig became a Junior Group Leader at the Centre for Plant Molecular Biology in Tuebingen, obtained his professorship in 2007 and the Venia legendi for plant physiology. In 2009 – 2010 he took over as a stand-in professor at the Technical University in Darmstadt. He was then appointed Professor of Nutrition Physiology of Horticultural Crops at Hohenheim University.
He has been managing director of the Institute for Horticultural Crop Science (Institut für Kulturpflanzenwissenschaften) since it was given this new name.

Membership and involvement 
Deutsche Gesellschaft für Pflanzenernährung (DGP), (German Society for Plant Nutrition)
Deutsche Botanische Gesellschaft (DBG),  (German Botanical Society)

Field of Interest and Publications 
Ludewig teaches and researches in molecular plant nutrition. His research area is concerned with the genetic and molecular basis of the uptake and distribution of nutrients by plants. His major interest is the uptake, perception and regulation of the ammonium transport system, nitrogen and phosphorus use in culture plants, and the special role of individual micro-nutrients. 
Since the year 2000 the institute has been involved in five EU-financed projects and employs undergraduates and doctoral students from more than ten countries.

Ludewig is much in demand as a speaker at congresses and is a member of the executive committee of Biofector; He has more than 50 publications together with his colleagues.

External links 
Uwe Ludewig on the Webpage of the University Hohenheim

References

Living people
German agronomists
1967 births